Dinia eagrus, the scarlet-tipped wasp mimic moth, is a moth of the family Erebidae. The species was first described by Pieter Cramer in 1779.

Description
The wings are hyaline (glass like), except for the brown veins and border and a brown mark across the forewings. The body is black brown with some metallic blue stripes, hairy, flat and broad. The abdomen is black and long with bright/red margins and tip.

Distribution
This species can be found in Mexico, Guatemala, Costa Rica, Nicaragua, Panama, Honduras and Rio de Janeiro, Brazil.

References

Euchromiina
Moths described in 1779
Arctiinae of South America